The International Exhibition of Navigation (Fiera internazionale della navigazione, also Mostra Oltremare) was a Specialised Expo organised to showcase the maritime industry. It held from  15 May to 15 October 1954 in Naples, Italy and received delegates from 25 countries. The Expo, which took place at the Mostra d’Oltremare, was recognised by the Bureau International des Expositions.

External links
Official website of the BIE

World's fairs in Italy
1954 in Italy
20th century in Naples